The 1988 Pan Pacific Open was a women's tennis tournament played on indoor carpet courts at the Tokyo Metropolitan Gymnasium in Tokyo in Japan and was part of the Category 4 tier of the 1988 WTA Tour. It was the 13th edition of the tournament and ran from 25 April through 1 May 1988. First-seeded Pam Shriver won the singles title and earned $50,000 first-prize money.

Finals

Singles

 Pam Shriver defeated  Helena Suková 7–5, 6–1
 It was Shriver's 2nd singles title of the year and the 20th of her career.

Doubles

 Pam Shriver /  Helena Suková defeated  Gigi Fernández /  Robin White 4–6, 6–2, 7–6(7–5)
 It was Shriver's 7th title of the year and the 110th of her career. It was Suková's 2nd title of the year and the 30th of her career.

References

External links
 Official website 
 Official website 
 ITF tournament edition details
 Tournament draws

Pan Pacific Open
Pan Pacific Open
Pan Pacific Open
Pan Pacific Open
Pan Pacific Open
Pan Pacific Open